Manookian is an Armenian surname. Notable people with the surname include:

 Arman Manookian (1904–1931), American artist 
 Jeff Manookian (born 1953), American pianist, composer, and conductor
 Roland Manookian (born 1980), British actor

Armenian-language surnames